St Hugh's Church or St Hugh of Lincoln Church is a Roman Catholic Parish church in Lincoln, England. It was built from 1892 to 1893. It is situated on the corner of Monks Road and Friars Lane in the city centre. It was designed by Albert Vicars and is a Grade II listed building.

History

Foundation
From 1799, a Roman Catholic chapel existed in Lincoln. It was at the junction of Broadgate and Silver Street. In 1870, Thomas Young of Kingerby Hall, who had been behind the construction of several Catholic churches in Lincolnshire, drew up plans to build in a church in its place. These plans came to nothing, so in 1886, the mayor of Lincoln, Francis Clarke, put forward £7,000 to build a church in the same place. He hired Albert Vicars, who designed St Anne's Church in Birmingham and helped design St Peter's Cathedral in Belfast. Francis Clarke died in 1888, and £3,500 was given for the church's construction by his estate trustees.  By 1892, enough money had been collected to build the church.

Construction
On 17 November 1892, the church foundation stone was laid by the Bishop of Nottingham, Edward Bagshawe. Construction work finished the next year, to a total cost of £7,300, and on 19 December 1893, the church was opened by Cardinal Herbert Vaughan.

Renovations
In November 1897 the stations of the cross were added. A new porch was added to the church in 1909 as well as several stained-glass windows. Some were designed by Alexander Gascoyne, who also did windows for St Peter and St Paul's Church in Nottinghamshire. The west window was installed in 1921. From 2008 to 2010, the church interior was refurbished with a new stone altar being added and the ceiling painted.

Parish
Included in the parish is the Chapel of St Francis in Bardney. It is situated on Station Road in the village. It has a Sunday Mass at 5pm on Saturdays.

St Hugh's Church has three Sunday Masses at 8.30am, 10.00am and 6.00pm. There is a Mass in Polish at 12 midday. From Monday to Saturday there is a weekday Mass at 10am.

External features

See also
 Roman Catholic Diocese of Nottingham

References

External links

 St Hugh's Parish site

Grade II listed churches in Lincolnshire
Roman Catholic churches in Lincolnshire
Saint Hugh
Roman Catholic churches completed in 1893
19th-century Roman Catholic church buildings in the United Kingdom
Grade II listed Roman Catholic churches in England
Gothic Revival church buildings in England
Gothic Revival architecture in Lincolnshire